Earl or Earle Morris may refer to:

Earl Morris (basketball coach) (born 1933), American high-school basketball coach
Earl H. Morris, American archeologist
Earle Morris (curler) (born 1945), Canadian curler and coach
Earle Morris Jr. (1928–2011), American politician